Neobisiidae is a family of pseudoscorpions distributed throughout Africa, the Americas and Eurasia and consist of 550 species in 32 genera. Some species live in caves while some are surface-dwelling.

Characteristics
The body color ranges from reddish or dark brown through olive green to yellow or creamy white. The legs are greenish. They usually have four eyes, but cave-dwelling species often have two or no eyes at all. The body length ranges from 1 to 5 mm.

Specimens of Neobisiidae have two very long pedipalps with palpal chelae (pincers) which strongly resemble the pincers found on true scorpions. The pedipalps consists of an immobile "hand" and "finger", with a separate movable finger controlled by an adductor muscle. Contrary to most other pseudoscorpions a venom gland and duct are located in the immobile "finger" part of each pedipalp, rather than in the movable one. The venom is used to capture and immobilize the prey.

References
 Catalogue of Life: 2015 Annual Checklist

 
Pseudoscorpion families